The Belgrade Fair is a large complex of three large domes and a dozen of smaller halls which is the location of the major trade fairs in Belgrade, the capital city of Serbia. It is located in the municipality of Savski Venac, on the right bank of the Sava river. One of the most recognizable landmarks of Belgrade, it is colloquially referred to only as Sajam.

Location 

Sajam is located on the Sava's right bank, in the western foothills of the Topčidersko Brdo and the neighborhood of Senjak, built on it. The Topčiderka river flows into the Sava, in the Bay of Čukarica, just south of the fair complex, while Novi Beograd and the peninsula of Mala Ciganlija are just across the Sava, which is at this point the narrowest.

History

Origin 

Originally, complex was built as the modern neighborhood of Sajmište in Novi Beograd, across the Sava, and opened on 11 November 1937. As it was turned into the Sajmište concentration camp during the World War II, it was not reconstructed after 1945. City government selected three possible locations for the new fair and in 1953 the location of Šest Topola ("Six Poplars"), a former beach on the right Sava bank was chosen, in the westernmost extension of the neighborhood of Bara Venecija. This was confirmed by the city administration's decision on 13 May 1953.

Construction 

Architectural design competition was organized and the jury selected the project by the architects Vladeta Maksimović and Milorad Pantović. However, the city government disliked the project and asked for more modern approach. Pantović worked in New York, Paris and London prior to World War II and Sajam was his first project to be realized and now he was charged with visiting the European fairs and suggesting something completely different from the architecture seen in Belgrade up to that point. The political climate changed in Yugoslavia in the 1950s, as the state broke ties with the Soviet Union. This brought to the ending of the Socialist realism period in Yugoslav architecture and the state wanted to appear as the modern, progressive and open to the world, giving Pantović almost carte blanche in choosing the modernist design.

Construction began in June 1955. Engineers   and Milan Krstić joined the designing-construction team. Architect  was appointed as the head of the company "Belgrade Fair in Construction" which built the complex. Building of the massive domed halls, especially of the largest one, was a daunting task and drew attention from world architects and engineers. They were made of prestressed concrete. Since then, the pre-war Sajmište became known as Staro Sajmište ("old trade fair").

Later development 

First exhibition premiered on 23 August 1957 and already from that year, Belgrade Fair was member of the UFI. The inaugural fair was the International Exhibition of Technics, with 1,500 exhibitors from 28 states. In 11 days it had 1,150,000 visitors, or 2 times more than Belgrade had inhabitants at the time. After only several fair exhibitions, the monumental and costly project paid off itself and became the display window for Yugoslav economy.

The very first broadcast of the Radio Television Belgrade (Dnevnik ("Journal") news program), was aired from Sajam on 23 August 1958, at 20:00. It marked 20 years since the television technology was exhibited by the Philips at the pre-war 1938 fair in Staro Sajmište. Basketball player Radivoj Korać set the EuroLeague's all-time single-game scoring record of 99 points on 15 January 1965, when the match OKK Beograd-Alvik Basket was held in Sajam during the FIBA European Champions Cup 1964–65 season. 

Second phase of the expansion of the complex began in 1966. Halls 7, 8 and 9 were built, but during the first exhibition held in them in the fall of 1966, they burned in fire. They were rebuilt in 1967, when the halls 10, 11 and 12 were also finished. The last phase was finished in 1975 when the western wing of the Hall 1, later renamed Hall 14 and today Hall 4, was finished.

In 1961 the fair hosted two European sports championships: 1961 European Amateur Boxing Championships and, few months later, EuroBasket 1961. Both were held in the Hall 1. The same hall hosted the first major concert of the "youth culture and rock and roll" in Yugoslavia in 1966, with over 100 bands. Since then, the hall became a favorite venue for the "urban musical guerrilla", but also for the popular mainstream rock musicians. Concerts were held by Ekatarina Velika, Yu Grupa, Bajaga i Instruktori, Riblja Čorba. Foreign musicians include Eric Clapton (in 1984), Iron Maiden (1984, 2007), Deep Purple (2003, 2006), Alice Cooper, Kiss, Duran Duran, etc. Occasionally, Serbian folk singers were also performing in the Hall 1, like Džej Ramadanovski (1992; 30,000 spectators).

During the COVID-19 pandemic in Serbia, Belgrade Fair is used as a vaccination center for the citizens of Serbia and foreigners. It was opened in January 25th, 2021 that consisting of 24 medical check-ups booths and 28 vaccination booths in Hall 3.

Transportation 

Area in the vicinity of the Sajam is among the busiest transportation sections of Belgrade. Entire complex is surrounded by the railways and both railway bridges over the Sava which connect old and new sections of Belgrade, are crossing the river at Sajam: old bridge, right on the northern tip, and new bridge which rises above the Sajam itself. "Boulevard of Vojvoda Mišić" which runs next to the complex is a major route which connects outer neighborhoods like Banovo Brdo, Čukarica, Žarkovo, Košutnjak and Topčider, and thus one of the busiest single streets in Belgrade, well known for daily traffic jams. Just north of the Sajam is a highway and one of the largest interchanges in Belgrade, Mostarska Petlja, and a Gazela bridge over the Sava. Additionally, the tram lines are passing through the boulevard, too, and the very first tram line in Belgrade passed through this area (Gospodarska Mehana), connecting Kalemegdan and Senjak.

Characteristics

Architecture 

The fairground was built as the contemporary urban complex, with the accent of the entire composition of object being on three exhibition pavilions under the domes which are interconnected via enclosed walkways. Though the domes were designed in the most modern spirit of the European architecture of the day, not to mention the "futuristic" construction process, architect Pantović also applied the appearance of the traditional circular cupola's from the Byzantine architecture.

Belgrade Fair also has commercial space, depositories, and workhouses. Additional services include post office, bank, tourist agencies, carrier companies, custom, and ambulance. Also, within Fair there are several important hosting object of various purposes.

Exhibitions 

Every year Belgrade Fair hosts over 30 regular international fair manifestations. Over 5,000 companies exhibit on the Belgrade Fair annually, with more than 1.500,000 visitors Many of these manifestations are members of respectable international organizations: the International Fair of Technique and Technical Advancements, International Fair of Clothing - World Fashion, International Fair of Furniture, Equipment and Internal Decorations, and SEEBBE (Southeast Europe Building Belgrade Expo) are members of UFI, Paris. International fair "BG CAR SHOW – MOTOPASSION" is one of the eighteen registered centers for presentation of European automobile industry by OICA, Paris.

In addition to regular manifestations, domes of Belgrade Fair host numerous other exhibitions, concerts, scientific and specialized meetings and the range of services of the Belgrade Fair is supported by bazaar of consumer goods. Since 2001, the Belgrade Fair is a member of CEFA (Central European Fair Association) and since September 2003, the International Fair of Tourism is a member of ETTFA.

Protection 

City and Republic institutes for the cultural monuments protection are working jointly on a proposal to put Sajam under the state protection. In January 2009 the government declared the entire complex a cultural monument, but then revoked its own decision a week later. The government revoked it as the placing of the entire complex would hamper the plans to privatize the venue. Instead, a month later, only the Hall 1 was protected by the state and declared a cultural monument.

See also 
 Novi Sad Fair
 Belgrade Book Fair

References

External links 

 
 Beogradski sajam pod zaštitom države

1938 establishments in Yugoslavia
Event venues established in 1938
Buildings and structures in Belgrade
Culture in Belgrade
Economy of Belgrade
Tourism in Belgrade
Tourist attractions in Belgrade
Fairs in Serbia
Fairgrounds
Savski Venac